The Roman Catholic Diocese of Nyahururu is a diocese located in the city of Nyahururu in the Ecclesiastical province of Nyeri in Kenya.

History
 December 5, 2002: Established as Diocese of Nyahururu from the Metropolitan Archdiocese of Nyeri

Bishops
 Bishops of Nyahururu (Latin Church)
 Bishop Luigi Paiaro (January 4, 2003 - December 24, 2011)
 Bishop Joseph Mbatia (since December 24, 2011)

Other priest of this diocese who became bishop
James Maria Wainaina Kungu, appointed Bishop of Muranga in 2009

See also
Roman Catholicism in Kenya

Sources
 GCatholic.org
 Catholic Hierarchy

Roman Catholic dioceses in Kenya
Christian organizations established in 1983
Roman Catholic dioceses and prelatures established in the 20th century
Roman Catholic Ecclesiastical Province of Nyeri